The women's lightweight competition in sumo at the 2009 World Games took place on 17 July 2009 at the Kaohsiung Municipal Kaohsiung Senior High School Gymnasium in Kaohsiung, Taiwan.

Competition format
A total of 15 athletes entered the competition. They fought in the cup system with repechages.

Results

Main draw

Repechages

Semifinals

Finals

References